Our Lady of Mercy Catholic High School is a private, Catholic high school in Fayetteville, Georgia, United States. It is located in the Roman Catholic Archdiocese of Atlanta. It is a Catholic college-preparatory high school located and one of several schools established by Archbishop John F. Donoghue.

Our Lady of Mercy Catholic High School opened to freshman and sophomore classes in August 2000. 

OLM is fully accredited through District-Wide Accreditation of The Office of Catholic Schools. Each school maintains full accreditation through AdvancED (the parent company of SACS – Southern Association of Colleges and Schools).

Campus 
The school is located near the confluence of Fayette, Fulton and Clayton counties. Its campus of approximately 48 acres includes an academic building, a field house, two football fields, a baseball field, a soccer field, a tennis court and a small pond. The primary football field is also equipped with a full track and field facility. In addition, the campus contains a one-mile cross country track.

Filming location 
The school served as the filming location for the high school scenes in Stephen Chbosky's 2021 film adaptation of Broadway musical Dear Evan Hansen.

See also

National Catholic Educational Association

Notes and references

Catholic secondary schools in Georgia (U.S. state)
Schools in Fayette County, Georgia
Educational institutions established in 2000
2000 establishments in Georgia (U.S. state)